W.A.K.O. European Championships 1998 in Leverkusen were the joint fourteenth European kickboxing championships (the other was held in Kyiv the same year) hosted by the W.A.K.O. organization and the fourth championships (world and European) to be held in Germany.  The event was open to amateur men and women based in Europe only and there were just the two styles on offer; Full-Contact and Light-Contact kickboxing.  By the end of the championships Russia was by far the dominant nation in terms of medals won, with Poland second and Hungary third.  The event was held in Leverkusen, Germany over six days starting on Tuesday, 1 December and ending on Sunday, 6 December 1998.

Full-Contact

Full-Contact is a form of kickboxing where fights are won primarily by stoppage or points decision, with kicks and punches allowed above the waist, although unlike professional kickboxing fighters had to wear head and body protection - more detail on the rules are available on the W.A.K.O. website.  At Leverkusen the men had twelve weight classes ranging from 51 kg/112.2 lbs to over 91 kg/+200.2 lbs, while the women had six, ranging from 48 kg/105.6 lbs to over 65 kg/+143 lbs.  Notable medalists included Robert Nowak, Almaz Gismeev and future female boxing legend Natascha Ragosina who had all won gold medals back at the last European championships in Belgrade.  By the championships end Russia was the strongest nation overall in Full-Contact, winning five golds, three silvers and three bronzes.

Men's Full-Contact Kickboxing Medals Table

Women's Full-Contact Kickboxing Medals Table

Light-Contact

Light-Contact is a form of kickboxing that is less physical than Full-Contact but more so than Semi-Contact and is often seen as an intermediate step between the two.  Fights are generally won by points scored on the basis of speed and technique over brute force and both fighters must wear head and body protection - more detail on Light-Contact rules can be found on the official W.A.K.O. website.  The men had eight weight divisions ranging from 57 kg/125.4 lbs to over 89 kg/+195.8 lbs while the women had five ranging from 50 kg/110 lbs to over 65 kg/143 lbs.  The most notable winner was Tomaž Barada who added to the gold he won at the last European championships.  By the end of the event Hungary was the top nation overall in Light-Contact with two golds, six silvers and two bronze medals.

Men's Light-Contact Kickboxing Medals Table

Women's Light-Contact Kickboxing Medals Table

Overall Medals Standing (Top 5)

See also
List of WAKO Amateur European Championships
List of WAKO Amateur World Championships

References

External links
 WAKO World Association of Kickboxing Organizations Official Site

WAKO Amateur European Championships events
Kickboxing in Germany
1998 in kickboxing